Ching Chung may refer to:

Places 

 Ching Chung Koon, a Taoist temple in Tuen Mun, Hong Kong
 Ching Chung stop, an MTR Light Rail stop adjacent to the temple

People 

 Hsu Ching-chung (1907–1996), Taiwanese politician and Vice Premier of the Republic of China from 1972 to 1981
 Liu Ching-chung, Taiwanese politician

See also 

 Chung Ching (born 1933), Hong Kong actor